Ramberg is a German surname. Notable people with the surname include:

Arthur von Ramberg (1819–1875), Austrian artist
Christina Ramberg (1946–1995), American artist
Edward Ramberg (1907–1995), American physicist
Georg von Ramberg, Austrian field marshal lieutenant
Hermann von Ramberg (1820–1899), Austrian cavalry general
Ian Ramberg  (1997–2012), American pilot
Jan Ramberg (Born 1932), Swedish professor emeritus
JJ Ramberg, host of MSNBC's weekend business program Your Business
Johann Daniel Ramberg (1732–1820), Austrian architect
Johann Heinrich Ramberg (1763–1840), German artist
Ludwig Ramberg (1874–1940), Swedish chemist
Örjan Ramberg (born 1948), Swedish actor

German-language surnames